Lois V. Vierk (born August 4, 1951 in Hammond, Indiana) is a post-minimalist composer who lives in New York City.

She received a B.A. degree in piano and ethnomusicology from UCLA in 1974.  She then attended Cal Arts, studying composition with Mel Powell, Leonard Stein, and Morton Subotnick, receiving her M.F.A. in 1978. She has conducted extensive study of gagaku music, studying for ten years with Suenobu Togi in Los Angeles, and for two years in Tokyo with Sukeyasu Shiba (the lead ryūteki player in Japan's Imperial Court Orchestra).

She has written many chamber works for different ensembles which are multiples of the same instrument. Her work uses glissando prominently and builds exponentially in level of activity. More recently she has written for mixed instrument ensembles, such as in her piece Timberline commissioned by the Relâche Ensemble, and Red Shift which appeared on the CD Bang on a Can Live Vol. 2. She has also composed for gagaku ensemble.

Vierk received a 1993 Foundation for Contemporary Arts Grants to Artists Award.

River Beneath the River

River Beneath the River was released in 2000. The album contains music written over a ten-year span including the title track originally commissioned by Kronos Quartet though not played by them. The liner notes were written by Robert Carl. Track listing:
 River Beneath the River  – 14:13 - Eva Greusser (violin), Patricia Davis (violin), Lois Martin (viola), Bruce Wang (cello); commissioned by the Barbican Centre for Kronos Quartet
 Into the Brightening Air  – 24:15 - Eva Greusser (violin), Patricia Davis (violin), Lois Martin (viola), Bruce Wang (cello); commissioned by Karen Bamonte Danceworks with support from Meet the Composer
 Jagged Mesa  – 21:349 - Gary Trosclair (trumpet), Bruce Eidem (trombone), Christopher Banks (bass trombone); commissioned by Risa Jaroslaw & Dancers with support from Meet the Composer
 Red Shift  – 12:16 - Ted Mook (cello), David Seidel (electric guitar), Jim Pugliese (percussion), Lois V Vierk (synthesizer); commissioned by Experimental Intermedia with support from the Mary Flagler Cary Charitable Trust

Simoom

Simoom was released in 1990. The liner notes, written by Arthur Stidfole, contain a short introduction to the composer, descriptions of the compositions, and biographical information on the performers. Track listing:
 五 Guitars (Go Guitars) for 5 electric guitars; David Seidel (electric guitars)  – 12:06
 Cirrus for 6 trumpets; Gary Trosclair (trumpets)  – 18:43
 Simoom for 8 cellos; Theodore Mook (cellos)  – 20:34

Films
 New York Composers:  Searching for a New Music (1997).  Directed by Michael Blackwood. Produced by Michael Blackwood Productions, in association with Westdeutscher Rundfunk.

References

Further reading
Zorn, John, ed. (2000). Arcana: Musicians on Music. New York: Granary Books/Hips Road. .

External links
LoisVVierk.com
 "The Living Composers Project: Lois Vierk", Composers21.com.
 recording of Blue Jets Red Sprites

 Experimental Intermedia page for Simoom
 Tzadik Records page for River Beneath the River

Listening
 Lois V Vierk interviewed by Charles Amirkhanian at the Exploratorium's Speaking of Music series in San Francisco, 23 April 1987)

1951 births
Living people
20th-century classical composers
21st-century classical composers
American women classical composers
American classical composers
People from Hammond, Indiana
Musicians from New York City
American women in electronic music
21st-century American composers
20th-century American women musicians
20th-century American composers
21st-century American women musicians
Classical musicians from New York (state)
20th-century women composers
21st-century women composers